Esa Vuorinen (born 26 June 1945) is a Finnish cinematographer. At the 26th Guldbagge Awards he won the award for Best Cinematography for the film Good Evening, Mr. Wallenberg. He has worked on more than 60 films since 1969.

Selected filmography
 Home for Christmas (1975)
 Poet and Muse (1978)
 Sign of the Beast (1981)
 Good Evening, Mr. Wallenberg (1990)
 Drömkåken (1993)
 The Border (2007)
 Dear Alice (2010)

References

External links

1945 births
Living people
Finnish cinematographers
Artists from Helsinki
Best Cinematographer Guldbagge Award winners